Jeeto Pakistan League (season 3) is the 3rd season of Jeeto Pakistan League, a "league"-based format of Jeeto Pakistan Presented by Fahad Mustafa, it is starting airing from Ramadan 2022 on ARY Digital.

Teams
The show consists of seven teams competing for grand prize.

In 2022, Ushna Shah joined the game show as Karachi Lions Captain replacing Humayun Saeed. Sarfraz Ahmed rejoined the league after 2020 for Quetta Knights team. 7th team was announced as Gujranwala Bulls for the city Gujranwala. Aijaz Aslam, who was Quetta Knights captain in 2021, was selected as a captain of Gujranwala Bulls.

Notes:
 C = Champions; 
 R = Runner-up;
 (x) = Position at the end of the league;

Matches

References 

Urdu-language television shows
Pakistani game shows
ARY Digital original programming